Sir John Howard (c. 1366-1437), of Wiggenhall and East Winch, in Norfolk, England, was a landowner, soldier, courtier, administrator and politician. His grandson was John Howard, 1st Duke of Norfolk, the great-grandfather of two queens, Anne Boleyn and Catherine Howard, two of the six wives of King Henry VIII.

Origins
Born in about 1366, he was the son and heir of Sir Robert Howard (died 1389), of Wiggenhall and East Winch, by his wife Margaret Scales (died 1416), daughter of Robert de Scales, 3rd Baron Scales, by his wife Katherine d'Ufford, a daughter of Robert d'Ufford, 1st Earl of Suffolk and a sister and co-heiress of William de Ufford, 2nd Earl of Suffolk. His grandfather Sir John Howard (died 1364), had served as Admiral of the Northern Fleet from 1335 to 1337 and had married Alice de Boys, daughter and heiress of Sir Robert de Boys, of Fersfield in Norfolk. The founder of the family was Sir William Howard (d.1308) of East Winch, a Justice of the Court of Common Pleas.

The title Earl of Suffolk was later acquired by his descendant Thomas Howard, 1st Earl of Suffolk (1561–1626), KG, the second son of Thomas Howard, 4th Duke of Norfolk, and survives today as a cadet branch of the Howard family.

Career
By 1380 he was married to an heiress and had been knighted by March 1387, when he served at sea in the fleet commanded by Richard FitzAlan, 11th Earl of Arundel that fought the French and their allies at the Battle of Margate. In 1389 both his father and his father-in-law died, bringing him most of the paternal lands as well as those inherited by his wife, which he retained for life when she died in 1391. These estates gave him not only a considerable income but also local influence. 

In 1394 he was appointed a member of the Royal Household for life, serving in the English expedition that year against Ireland. In 1397, by which time he had married another heiress, he was made a justice of the peace (JP) for both Suffolk and Essex and in September was elected a Member (MP) of the Parliament of England for Essex. This Parliament was used by King Richard II to penalise his opponents and, on behalf of the Crown, Howard was empowered to seize the estates of rebel nobles and to collect large fines from the dissident counties of Essex and Hertfordshire. He then accompanied the King on his second expedition to Ireland in 1399.  

His position in the Royal Household was not renewed under the new reign of King Henry IV but he continued to sit as a JP and serve on royal commissions. He served the first of two terms as High Sheriff of Essex and Hertfordshire in 1400, during which he was summoned to the Great Council of August 1401, and was High Sheriff of Cambridgeshire and Huntingdonshire in both 1401 and 1402. In 1407 he returned to Parliament as MP for Cambridgeshire.

In 1408 his wife's father died and she inherited his lands. Chosen again as Sheriff of Essex and Hertfordshire in 1414, he was involved in preparations for the first expedition to France of the new King, Henry V. In 1420 he was in difficulty over a feud in Suffolk with the influential MP Sir Thomas Kerdiston, which Sir Thomas Erpingham reported to the Privy Council, but by 1422 was sufficiently in favour locally to be elected Suffolk's MP.

After sitting in this third Parliament, and following the death of his second wife in 1426, he took less part in local administration, though continuing as a JP and on royal commissions. In February 1436 he was asked to contribute 100 marks to the cost of the Duke of York’s expedition to France. 

He then went on pilgrimage to the Holy Land, where he died in Jerusalem on 17 November 1437. His remains were brought back to England and buried beside his second wife at Stoke-by-Nayland.

Marriages and issue
He married twice:
Firstly, in about 1380, to Margaret de Plaiz (d.August 1391, buried Weeting, Norfolk), the daughter and heiress of John de Plaiz, 5th Baron Plaiz (1342/3-1389), by his second wife Joan Stapleton, a daughter of Sir Miles Stapleton of Bedale in Yorkshire. By his first wife he had one son and heir:
John Howard (1385-1409), who predeceased his father, having married Joan Walton, a daughter of John Walton of Wivenhoe, by his wife Margaret Sutton, by whom he left one daughter and sole heiress:
Elizabeth Howard (died 1475), who in 1425 married John de Vere, 12th Earl of Oxford, to whom descended the chief Howard estates, including East Winch, and the baronies of Scales and Plaiz.

Secondly, before June 1397, he married Alice Tendring (d.18 October 1426, buried  Stoke-by-Nayland), the only daughter and heiress of Sir William Tendring (died 1408), of Tendring Hall in the parish of Stoke-by-Nayland in Suffolk, by his wife Catherine Mylde (died 1402), widow of Sir Thomas Clopton of Kentwell Hall in the parish of Long Melford in Suffolk, and daughter of William Mylde, of Clare in Suffolk. By his second wife he  had two sons:
Sir Robert Howard (died 1436), who also predeceased his father, having in 1420 married Margaret de Mowbray (died 1459), the daughter and heiress of Thomas de Mowbray, 1st Duke of Norfolk, by whom he had three children, including:
John Howard, 1st Duke of Norfolk, eldest son and heir.
Henry Howard (died 1446).

Landholdings and succession
Through both his parents and through his two wives, he acquired estates in several adjoining counties, among them:
In Norfolk: Wiggenhall,  Fersfield, East Winch, five manors near King’s Lynn, Garboldisham, Toft, Weeting and Knapton.
In Suffolk: Stoke-by-Nayland, Chelsworth, and Brook Hall near Dunwich.
In Essex: Stansted Mountfichet, Oakley and Moze.
In Cambridgeshire: Fowlmere.

After the death of his eldest son in 1409, who left an only daughter, he settled many of these properties on this grand-daughter and when she married in 1425, he assured her husband John de Vere that many more would follow. His second son then died in 1436, leaving a grandson, John Howard, the future 1st Duke of Norfolk, as the heir to be provided for. After his own death in 1437, bitter feuds over the inheritance broke out between the de Veres and the Howards, which continued into the Wars of the Roses, during which both John de Vere and John Howard lost their lives.

References

1360s births
1437 deaths
Year of birth uncertain
English MPs September 1397
English MPs 1422
People from King's Lynn and West Norfolk (district)
Knights Bachelor
High Sheriffs of Essex 
High Sheriffs of Hertfordshire
High Sheriffs of Cambridgeshire
People from Stoke-by-Nayland
People from Stansted Mountfitchet
People from Fowlmere